Kris Wirtz (born December 12, 1969) is a Canadian former pair skater. With Kristy Sargeant, he is the 1999 Four Continents silver medallist, the 1994 Skate Canada International champion, and a two-time Canadian national champion. The pair competed at two Winter Olympics.

Career 
Early in his career, Wirtz competed at the Canadian Championships in singles, ice dance, and fours, as well as pairs. He competed with Sherry Ball at the 1992 Winter Olympics in Albertville. Later in 1992, he teamed up with Kristy Sargeant.

Sargeant/Wirtz made their debut at the 1993 Canadian Championships and finished fifth. The following season, they won the national silver medal and were assigned to the 1994 Winter Olympics in Lillehammer, where they placed tenth. They then finished 11th at the 1994 World Championships.

In the 1994–95 season, Sergeant/Wirtz won gold at the 1994 Skate Canada International, having placed seventh a year earlier, but dipped to fifth at the Canadian Championships. The next season, they reached the national podium again and finished seventh at their second Worlds. The pair would appear at a total of seven World Championships during their career, placing as high as sixth (1997, 1999).

In 1998, Sargeant/Wirtz won their first national title and were sent to the 1998 Winter Olympics in Nagano. They had a very disappointing Olympics, placing 12th after many problems, but came back and were the only pair in the entire event to skate two clean programs at the 1998 World Championships, and were robbed of at least the silver medal, placing a disgraceful seventh. The pair became national champions for the second time in 1999, where they had been widely expected to lose to the rising stars Jamie Sale and David Pelletier, who had posted better results on the grand prix circuit. They had their best chance ever to medal at worlds that year, placing fourth after the short program, but two minor mistakes in the long dropped them to sixth, while the Polish bronze medallists had two major errors which would have left the door wide open for them had they skated cleanly.

Thereafter they were soundly passed by Sale and Pelletier as the top Canadian team, and never seriously factored on the world or international stage ever again. They surprised many by retiring after the 2001 season, when still solidly entrenched as Canada's number 2 team they were virtual locks for a spot on the 3 team 2002 Olympic team. They returned to competition for the 2002-2003 season, ending their amateur careers withdrawing prior to the long program at the 2003 Canadians with injury.

Wirtz was the Canadian team captain for five years. They work as coaches at the Kitchener-Waterloo Skating Club in Waterloo, Ontario, Canada.

Personal life 
Wirtz is from Marathon, Ontario. His brother was Paul Wirtz, a figure-skating coach deceased April 6, 2006, and his nephew is pair skater Sean Wirtz.

Wirtz married Kristy Sargeant in 1999 and their first child together was born in 2002. On January 3, 2010 the Olympic torch relay passed through Marathon, Ontario. Wirtz's father, Gunter Wirtz, carried the Olympic torch in a procession through the local hockey arena.

Competitive highlights

With Ball

With Sargeant

References

External links
 Kitchener-Waterloo Skating Club

1969 births
Canadian male pair skaters
Figure skaters at the 1992 Winter Olympics
Figure skaters at the 1994 Winter Olympics
Figure skaters at the 1998 Winter Olympics
Four Continents Figure Skating Championships medalists
Living people
Olympic figure skaters of Canada
Sportspeople from Thunder Bay